Tasha Tilberg (born August 26, 1979, in Chilliwack, British Columbia) is a Canadian fashion model.

Modeling 

Tilberg has appeared in advertisements for Alberta Ferretti, Bloomingdale's, Comma, Fendi, Esprit, Gucci, Mango, Missoni, Moschino, Versace and Versus, and she has walked in fashion shows for, among others, Alessandro Dell'Acqua, Anna Molinari, Balenciaga, Blumarine, Dolce & Gabbana, DKNY, Fendi, Versace, Genny, Iceberg, Jil Sander, Les Copains, Marc by Marc Jacobs, Missoni, Moschino, Narciso Rodriguez, Rifat Ozbek, Richard Tyler, Sportmax, Victor Alfaro, Versus, Isabel Marant, Miu Miu and Yohji Yamamoto. She has appeared in Mademoiselle, Vogue, W, ELLE, Harper's Bazaar, Marie Claire and Flare, and was a spokesmodel for CoverGirl.

Personal life
Tasha has twins, a boy and a girl, called Bowie and Gray respectively, to whom she gave birth in late 2012, and her third child in 2020.

References

External links

 Tasha Tilberg at AskMen.com

1979 births
Canadian female models
Lesbian models
Living people
People from Chilliwack
21st-century Canadian LGBT people